Several asteroids or minor planets in the asteroid belt with Gotland-related names have been discovered and named by Swedish astronomer Claes-Ingvar Lagerkvist. Others have been named during courses of the Uppsala-ESO Survey of Asteroids and Comets at the European Southern Observatory and have not been credited to a single discoverer, but rather collective work.

, 175,658 asteroids have been numbered and almost 14,300 of those have been named. 205 have been named after places, persons or fictional figures in Sweden. A portion of these are from the island of Gotland. Gotland is fairly well represented because Lagerkvist has been a summer resident on the island since 1983.

The first asteroid to receive a Gotland-related name was 3250 Martebo in 1979, named after a settlement on the island. For the latest naming, a competition hosted by the Swedish Astronomical Society was held in Visby in 2011. The asteroid was named 137052 Tjelvar after Tjelvar, the mythological first man to bring fire to the island, thereby breaking the spell that caused Gotland to sink beneath the waves every day and rise during the night.

The suggested names are submitted to the International Astronomical Union (IAU) for inspection before they are approved. IAU want to keep the number of "troublesome" names to a minimum. Nevertheless, the name 7545 Smaklösa ("Tasteless" or "Tacky") after a Gotlandish music group, passed inspection. According to Lagerkvist: "I don't think they knew what the word meant in Swedish."

The names of the asteroids along with a description of what or who they were named after are entered into the NASA Jet Propulsion Laboratory (JPL) Small-Body Database Browser. A number of the various places on Gotland described there are sockens but referred to as parishes; a common practice since most non-Swedes are unaware of the regional distribution in Sweden and parish is the closest form to describe them. On 1January 2016, the sockens were reconstituted into the administrative areas Districts.

This list is probably incomplete since more asteroids are named frequently.

Asteroids

References 

Gotland
Lists of asteroids